German submarine U-616 was a Type VIIC U-boat built for Nazi Germany's Kriegsmarine, for service during World War II.
She was laid down on 20 May 1941 by Blohm & Voss, Hamburg as yard number 592, launched on 8 February 1942 and commissioned on 2 April 1942 under Oberleutnant zur See (Oblt.z.S.) Johann Spindlegger.

On 8 October 1942, Spindlegger was replaced by Oblt.z.S. Siegfried Koitschka, who commanded her until she was sunk on 17 May 1944.

Design
German Type VIIC submarines were preceded by the shorter Type VIIB submarines. U-616 had a displacement of  when at the surface and  while submerged. She had two shafts and two  propellers.

U-616 was fitted with five  torpedo tubes (four fitted at the bow and one at the stern), fourteen torpedoes, one  SK C/35 naval gun, 220 rounds, and a  C/30 anti-aircraft gun. The boat had a complement of between forty-four and sixty.

Service history
The boat's career began with training at 8th U-boat Flotilla on 2 April 1942, followed by active service on 1 January 1943 as part of the 6th Flotilla. On 1 June 1943 she transferred to operations in the Mediterranean as part of 29th Flotilla until her sinking in 1944.

Wolfpacks
U-616 took part in three wolfpacks, namely:
 Burggraf (24 February – 5 March 1943)
 Westmark (6 – 11 March 1943)
 Stürmer (11 – 20 March 1943)

Fate

Summary of raiding history

See also
 Mediterranean U-boat Campaign (World War II)

References

Notes

Citations

Bibliography

External links

German Type VIIC submarines
1942 ships
U-boats commissioned in 1942
U-boats sunk in 1944
U-boats sunk by depth charges
U-boats sunk by US warships
U-boats sunk by British aircraft
World War II shipwrecks in the Mediterranean Sea
World War II submarines of Germany
Ships built in Hamburg
Maritime incidents in May 1944